Turgenitubulus is a genus of land snails in the family Camaenidae. This genus is endemic to Australia.

Species include:
 Turgenitubulus aslini
 Turgenitubulus christenseni
 Turgenitubulus costus
 Turgenitubulus depressus
 Turgenitubulus foramenus
 Turgenitubulus opiranus
 Turgenitubulus pagodula
 Turgenitubulus tanmurrana

References

 
Camaenidae
Taxonomy articles created by Polbot